The King's Academy is a private, kindergarten through high school located in Jonesboro, Indiana.

See also
 List of high schools in Indiana

References

External links
 Official Website

Private high schools in Indiana
Buildings and structures in Grant County, Indiana